Flevum was a castrum and port of the Romans in Frisia (actual northern Netherlands), built when emperor Augustus wanted to conquer the German populated territories between the Rhine river and the Elbe river.

History

Two Roman fortifications (usually called Flevum I and Flevum II) have been discovered at the mouth of actual North Sea Canal: the first was initially a small marching camp made by Tiberius (similar to the nearby Ermelo fortification built in 4 AD), and later enlarged to be a castrum and a port by Germanicus around 14 AD. The second was built by Caligula in 40 AD, 2 km to the northwest of the first. Both the fortifications were inside the western area of Magna Germania that was the short-lived Germania Inferior.

Indeed the ruins of a Roman naval base at actual Velsen (Netherlands) are believed to be the ancient Flevum, which is listed as Phleoum, Romanized to Phleum, in Ptolemy (2.10).

The first fortification was rather a simple and temporary construction site. Its ground plan was more or less triangular and covered an area of about one hectare. The defense systems consisted mainly of an earth wall with an upstream, simple trench. A wooden palisade with a wooden gate defended the eastern part of the river bank. This camp did not yet have port functions initially, although ships could lie on the gently sloping river bank. Shortly thereafter, the wooden fence was reinforced with a reinforced door. This harbor gate gave access to a short open jetty where larger ships could be loaded and unloaded so they would not have to be pulled into the countryside. This castrum was enlarged to 2 hectares.

Shipsheds have been discovered in Flevum.

The second fort -Flevum II- was built after the destruction of the first castrum around 28 AD, but has left few archaeological evidences. It seems to have survived only until 55 AD.

Maps Gallery

See also
 Germania
 Fectio

Notes

Bibliography
 Saskia G. van Dockum: Das niederländische Flussgebiet. In: Tilmann Bechert und Willem J. H. Willems (Hrsg.): Die römische Reichsgrenze zwischen Mosel und Nordseeküste. Theiss, Stuttgart 1995, S. 79.
 J.-M.A.W.Morel. The early roman harbours. Velsen, in: R.W.Brandt, W.Groenman-van Waateringe & S.E.van der Leeuw (eds.), Assendelver Polder Papers 1, Amsterdam 1987, pags. 169-175.

Roman sites in Germany
Germania (Roman province)
Germany in the Roman era